This is a list of West Indian One-day International cricketers. A One Day International (ODI) is an international cricket match between two representative teams, each having ODI status, as determined by the International Cricket Council (ICC). An ODI differs from Test matches in that the number of overs per team is limited, and that each team has only one innings. The list is arranged in the order in which each player won his first ODI cap. Where more than one player won his first ODI cap in the same match, those players are listed alphabetically by surname.

Key

Players
Statistics are correct as of 21 August 2022.

Notes:
1 Clayton Lambert, Xavier Marshall and Hayden Walsh Jr. also played ODI cricket for United States. Only their records for West Indies are given above. 
2 Brian Lara and Chris Gayle also played ODI cricket for ICC World XI. Only their records for West Indies are given above.

Captains

This is a complete list of every man who has captained the West Indies in at least one One Day International. Updated to 21 August 2022.

See also
One Day International
West Indian cricket team

References

ODI
West Indies